The Tawhid Kataib Horan (توحید کتائب حوران) is a Syrian rebel group that operates in the Daraa and Quneitra governorates of the Horan region. The group has been supplied with BGM-71 TOW anti-tank missiles. Its founder, major Mohammad al-Turkmani, was killed in clashes with loyalists.

See also
List of armed groups in the Syrian Civil War

References

Anti-government factions of the Syrian civil war